Yves Fraisse (born 14 November 1943) is a French rower. He competed at the 1964, 1968, 1972 and the 1976 Summer Olympics.

References

1943 births
Living people
French male rowers
Olympic rowers of France
Rowers at the 1964 Summer Olympics
Rowers at the 1968 Summer Olympics
Rowers at the 1972 Summer Olympics
Rowers at the 1976 Summer Olympics
Sportspeople from Saint-Louis, Senegal
20th-century French people